Twin Husbands is a 1933 American Pre-Code film directed by Frank R. Strayer.

Plot summary

Cast
John Miljan as Jerry Van Trevor/Jerry Werrenden
Shirley Grey as Chloe Werrenden
Monroe Owsley as Colton Drain
Hale Hamilton as Colonel Gordon Lewis
Robert Elliott as Sergeant Kerrigan
Maurice Black as Feets
William Franklin as Chuck
Wilson Benge as Greyson the Butler

External links

1933 films
1933 drama films
American drama films
American black-and-white films
Films directed by Frank R. Strayer
Chesterfield Pictures films
1930s English-language films
1930s American films
English-language drama films